Grado (Asturian: Grau) is a municipality in the Autonomous Community of the Principality of Asturias in Spain. It is bordered on the north by Candamo and Las Regueras, on the east by Proaza, Santo Adriano and Oviedo, on the south by Teverga and Yernes y Tameza, and on the west by Belmonte de Miranda and Salas.

Parishes 

Ambás
Báscones
Bayo
Berció
Cabruñana
Castañéu
Coalla
El Fresno
Grado
Gurullés
La Mata
Las Villas
Peñaflor
Pereda
Rañeces
Restiello
Rodiles
Rubiano
Sama de Grado
Santa María de Grado
Santa María de Villandás
Santianes de Molenes
Santo Adriano del Monte
Sorribas
Tolinas
Vigaña
Villamarín
Villapañada

Gallery

Natural wonders
 Caldoveiro Peak

See also
Capilla de los Dolores (Grado)

References

External links
Ayuntamiento de Grau/Grado (Spanish and some articles in English)

Municipalities in Asturias